Brewers Exchange, also known as Murdock Place, is a historic office building located at Baltimore, Maryland, United States. It is a three-story Renaissance Revival style building designed by Joseph Evans Sperry (1854-1930) and built in 1896.  The façade is faced with terra cotta and includes such decorative elements as two-story half-round Ionic pilasters, cartouches, pediments, window surrounds, a garland frieze, and a balustrade at the edges of a flat roof. It was used by the exchange for only a short time.

Brewers Exchange was listed on the National Register of Historic Places in 1985.

References

External links

, including photo from 1984, at Maryland Historical Trust

Buildings and structures in Baltimore
Commercial buildings on the National Register of Historic Places in Baltimore
Commercial buildings completed in 1896
Downtown Baltimore
Joseph Evans Sperry buildings